NZCA/LINES is the 2012 debut album by NZCA/LINES.

Accolades

References

2012 debut albums